U/A is the eighth studio album by Chandrabindoo, released in 2008 as their "Awshtom Aschorjyo" (Lit. Eighth Surprise) after a break of 3 years. The album title is a reference to the movie rating standard meaning Universal/Adult.

Track listing
 Uthe Jaoa Sniri
 Dhyatterika
 Ami Dibos
 Tatin
 Khachhe Khak
 D Minor
 Bhyabachyaka
 Tabo Mukut
 Kichhu Chaini
 Par Kore de Ma

It contained extended versions of previously created title tracks by Chandrabindoo apart from love and political songs. "Tatin" and "Tabo Mukut" have gained a cult popularity due to their lyrics and tune respectively. This album was re-released by T-Series as "Dekhbi Jolbi Phulbi" when they took over the music rights from Big Music.

References

2008 albums
Chandrabindoo (band) albums